Egon Varnusz (born Budapest, Hungary, November 15, 1933 - Budapest, June 26, 2008) was a Hungarian chess Master and writer.

Biography 
Varnusz competed in five Hungarian Chess Championships: in 1958, 1961, 1963, 1965, and 1966. In 1966, he made his best career result with 10.5/18, for 6th place, as Gideon Barcza won. Varnusz shared 2nd-3rd places in the medium-strength Master event at Salgótarján 1978 with 10/13.

Writings 

Varnusz is best known as a chess writer, and has published 15 titles, in both German and English (translated). Here is a list of his book titles (http://www.chessworld.org, the Egon Varnusz entry).
 Die ausgewählten Partien von Lajos Portisch, by Egon Varnusz, Harri Deutsch 1990, in German.
 Wie spielt man Bogo-Indisch, by Egon Varnusz, Dreir Publishers 1989, in German.
 Play Anti-Indian Systems, by Egon Varnusz, Franckh-Kosmos 1990, .
 Play the Caro-Kann, by Egon Varnusz, MacMillan 1991 (2nd edition), .
 Semi-Slawisch 1 -- Meraner Variante, by Egon Varnusz, Dreier Publishers 1992, in German.
 Semi-Slawisch 2 -- Antimeraner, by Egon Varnusz, Dreier Publishers 1992, in German.
 Angenommenes Damengambit (Queen's Gambit Accepted), by Egon Varnusz, Düsseldorf 1994, Schachverlag Manfred Maguer, in German. English version (pub. Schmidt Schach) translated by Gábor Pirisi. 
 Neuerungen in Slawisch, by Egon Varnusz, Dreier Publishers 1994, in German.
 Slawisch, by Egon Varnusz, Dreier Publishers 1994, in German. 
 Paul Keres Best Games, Volume I: Closed Games, by Egon Varnusz, London 1994, Cadogan Chess, .
 Paul Keres Best Games, Volume II: Semi-Open Games, by Egon Varnusz, London 1994, Cadogan Chess, .
 Aljechin, der Grosste, by Egon Varnusz and Arpad Walter Foldeak, Düsseldorf 1994, Schachverlag Manfred Maguer, .
 Klassische System / Spanisch ohne a6, by Egon Varnusz, 1995, Becker Publishers. 
 Emanuel Lasker Games 1889-1907, by Egon Varnusz, 1998, Schmidt Schach Publishers.
 M.M. Botvinnik I, Games 1924-1940, by Egon Varnusz, 1999, Schmidt Schach Publishers.

References

External links 

 
 Books by Egon Varnusz

1933 births
2008 deaths
Writers from Budapest
Hungarian chess players
Hungarian chess writers
Chess FIDE Masters
20th-century chess players